MSC World Europa is a  delivered for MSC Cruises and built at the Chantiers de l'Atlantique shipyard in Saint-Nazaire, France. MSC World Europa is set to commence public operations from 20 December 2022 in a 9-day roundtrip from Qatar after serving as a hotel ship in Doha during the 2022 FIFA World Cup. She will become MSC's first World-class ship and be joined by three sister ships in 2024, 2025, and 2027, respectively.

History

Planning 
In April 2016, MSC Cruises unveiled its newest class of cruise ships, the World class, after it signed a letter of intent for up to four World-class vessels from STX France, an order worth approximately €4 billion, at Élysée Palace. MSC also announced all ships in the class would be powered by liquefied natural gas (LNG).

Construction 
On 31 October 2019, MSC revealed the name of the first World-class ship as MSC Europa and held the ship's steel-cutting ceremony at Chantiers de l'Atlantique, inaugurating the construction for the new ship. On 29 June 2020, MSC held the keel-laying ceremony for the ship renamed as MSC World Europa, in which two coins were placed under the keel for good luck. In June 2021 she was relocated in a drydock towards the sea.

MSC World Europa was floated out in December 2021, and completed her first sea trials using LNG in the Atlantic during June 2022.

The ship was delivered on 24 October 2022. The construction of her sister ship  started on the same day.

Operational career 
In November 2019, Qatar signed an agreement with MSC to charter MSC World Europa and MSC Poesia as accommodations vessels for fans attending the 2022 FIFA World Cup, with the ships berthed at Doha Port during the games.

Design and specifications 
In May 2017, at the delivery ceremony of  held at STX France, MSC released new details and renderings of the World class of ships. In the announcement, MSC revealed that each of the four ships it had ordered would hold a guest capacity of 6,850 passengers across 2,760 passenger cabins. Initial features announced included square cabins, a glass pool lounge, and sections designed specifically for families. The aft of the ships would also be open, with the lower promenade deck flanked by balcony cabin towers.

As MSC World Europa is powered by LNG, it would reportedly allow her to sail with a 99% decrease in sulfur dioxide emissions, an 85% decrease in nitric oxide emissions, and a 20% decrease in carbon dioxide emissions, when compared with non-LNG-powered ships. She will also become the world's first ship to implement an LNG-powered fuel cell. The 50-kilowatt fuel cell demonstrator aboard the ship will incorporate solid oxide fuel cell (SOFC) technology and use LNG to produce onboard electricity and heat and reportedly further reduce greenhouse gas emissions by 30% when compared with ships powered by conventional LNG engines.

References 

World Europa
Ships built by Chantiers de l'Atlantique
Ships built in France
2021 ships